Gulou District is one of 11 districts of Nanjing, the capital of Jiangsu province, China.

It is named after the Drum Tower of Nanjing (Gulou).

Administrative subdivisions
Gulou has administrative jurisdiction to 13 subdistricts:

In 2013, Xiaguan merged into Gulou gaining six additional subdistricts.

See also
 Hunan Road Commercial Street

References

www.njgl.gov.cn 
www.xzqh.org 

County-level divisions of Jiangsu
Districts of Nanjing